Kwangtung was a British-made dispatch boat launched in 1863.

History
Kwangtung was purchased by Horatio Nelson Lay, Inspector General of the Qing Dynasty Chinese Maritime Customs Service in May 1863 as part of an effort to bolster the Qing Dynasty naval force in response to the ongoing Taiping Rebellion. Thereafter she became part of the Lay-Osborn Flotilla commanded by Sherard Osborn. She was put under the command of Lieut. William Allen Young. Upon her arrival in China, the Qing government ordered the ship to be renamed as Pai Yueh.

Disagreements between the Qing government and Lay over the command and composition of the Lay-Osborn Flotilla led to its disbandment in 1863, and Kwangtung was taken to Bombay. There, along with Thule, Kwangtung was sold to the Indian government for a total of £8,142.

Citations

References

 
 
 
 

1863 ships
Naval ships of Imperial China
Naval ships of China